In extremis is a 2000 French film written and directed by Etienne Faure.  It tells the story of Thomas, a young man whose lover dies, leaving Thomas to fight for custody of her orphaned son.  It takes its name from the Latin phrase which means "in the furthest reaches" or "at the point of death".

Cast
 Sébastien Roch as Thomas
 Julie Depardieu as Anne
 Jérémy Sanguinetti as Grégoire
 Christine Boisson as Caroline
 Aurélien Wiik as Vincent
 Sophie Mounicot as Laurence
 Candice Hugo as Géraldine
 Delphine Chanéac as Sophie

External links

2000 films
French drama films
2000s French-language films
2000s French films